The 1917 New South Wales state election was held on 24 March 1917. This election was for all of the 90 seats in the 24th New South Wales Legislative Assembly and it was conducted in single-member constituencies with a second ballot if a majority was not achieved on the first. The 23rd parliament of New South Wales was dissolved on 21 February 1917 by the Governor, Sir Gerald Strickland, on the advice of the Premier William Holman.

Since the previous election, Premier Holman had left the Labor Party with 17 of his supporters and entered into a coalition with the opposition Liberal Party, as a result of the 1916 conscription dispute that split the Labor Party nationally. In early 1917, Holman's supporters merged with the Liberals to form the New South Wales branch of the Nationalist Party. Although the merged party was dominated by former Liberals, Holman became its leader, and thus remained premier.

The Nationalists won a sweeping victory, scoring a 13-seat swing which was magnified by the large number of former Labor MPs who followed Holman out of the party. It thus presaged the federal Nationalists' equally comprehensive victory in the federal election two months later.

Key dates

Results

{{Australian elections/Title row
| table style = float:right;clear:right;margin-left:1em;
| title        = 1917 New South Wales state election
| house        = Legislative Assembly
| series       = New South Wales state election
| back         = 1913
| forward      = 1920
| enrolled     = 1,109,830
| total_votes  = 616,146
| turnout %    = 61.43
| turnout chg  = -6.81
| informal     = 6,332
| informal %   = 1.02
| informal chg = –1.28
}}

|}

Retiring members

See also
 Candidates of the 1917 New South Wales state election
 Members of the New South Wales Legislative Assembly, 1917–1920

Notes

References

Elections in New South Wales
New South Wales State Election, 1917
1910s in New South Wales
New South Wales State Election, 1917